Timothy Kneeland "Timo" Ellis is a multi-instrumentalist and record producer from New York City, and is frontman vocalist for the band Netherlands.

In 1997 Ellis and Sean Lennon joined Cibo Matto. As a quartet (Yuka Honda, Miho Hatori, Ellis, Lennon) Cibo Matto released an EP, Super Relax (1997) and their second album Stereo ★ Type A (1999). In 2001, Ellis released his first solo EP, The Enchanted Forest of Timo Ellis.

Solo discography

Albums
T.O.A.S.T. Redux
High Score
The White Bronco
Epic Mini
After
The New Yorker
Eyebrows
The Death of Fantasy

EPs
The Enchanted Forest of Timo Ellis
Master of Pop Hits
Uppalappu
Civilian Pursuits
Hellven
Feral Minty
Undead Horses
I'm Not Going to the Store
Death Is Everywhere

As others
U. McDammon The Fastest Finger in the World
The Marcy Mnemonics Kookoo Banana, Van Halen Two
Gazillion Fear of Sucking
Bird of Doom Way Down Upon the Swan
Shania Divorce Shocker! Doublemint Gonzo (with John Paul Keenon)
The Off Scene The Off Scene
The Off Scene Heavy Muppet
The Off Scene S.O.A.
Biker Period Biker Period, Biker Period II (with Kirsten McCord)
Gluttonius Roman Style (with Suzanne von Aichinger and John Paul Keenon)
Blood of the Runt (feat. Runt Roo) 
Miss Michigan (with Gustavo Saenz)
SEE? "Lighteninging on Your Thames" (with Brandon Seabrook, Jon Ehlers and Stuart Popejoy)

With Netherlands
Fantasmatic
Silicon Vapor
Audubon
Hope Porn
Black Gaia
Green Lips And Lightning (previously unreleased B-sides)
Zombie Techno
Zombie Techno (Undead)

References

External links

netherlandsband.com (Official)

American multi-instrumentalists
Living people
Musicians from New York City
Musicians from Washington (state)
Evergreen State College alumni
Morningwood members
Cibo Matto members
Year of birth missing (living people)